Robert Emerson Bartholomew (born August 17, 1958) is an American medical sociologist, journalist and author living in New Zealand. He is an Honorary Senior Lecturer in the Department of Psychological Medicine at the University of Auckland in New Zealand. In addition to publishing more than 60 academic papers, he has written or co-written 16 popular science and skeptical non-fiction books.  He writes for several newspapers and journals on sociological and fringe science topics, including Psychology Today, Skeptical Inquirer, and British magazines The Skeptic and Fortean Times.

He is an expert in fields such as mass hysteria and mass psychogenic illness and is frequently consulted by media during current events of sociological phenomena such as incidences of suspected mass hysteria or panic.

Academic work
Bartholomew first obtained a radio broadcasting certificate studying at SUNY Adirondack in 1977 followed in 1979 by a bachelor's degree in communications at Plattsburgh. By 1984 he had been awarded a master's degree in American sociology at State University of New York. In 1992 he gained a masters in Australian sociology from Flinders University in Adelaide, South Australia followed by a doctorate in sociology from James Cook University in Queensland, Australia. Finally, in 2001 he gained his teaching qualification from Upper Valley Teachers Institute in social studies.

Bartholomew has also lived and worked in Malaysia and in 2009 worked in sociology at International University College of Technology. In April 2010 he took up a teaching position at Botany Downs Secondary College in Auckland, New Zealand. He is currently an Honorary Senior Lecturer in the Department of Psychological Medicine at the University of Auckland in New Zealand.

In 2012, Bartholomew published Australia's forgotten children: The corrupt state of education in the Northern Territory: A case study of educational apartheid at an aboriginal pretend school in which he uncovered human rights abuses of indigenous Australian aboriginal children who were being exposed to harmful asbestos in the Northern Territory with the knowledge of the Northern Territory Department of Education.

Bartholomew's principal area of academic contribution is in the field of mass psychogenic illness, previously known as mass hysteria, both historical and present day cases, an area he has been studying for over 25 years. He has written extensively about 600 notable instances including the Salem witch trials, the 2011 Le Roy illness, which Bartholomew has described as "the first case of this magnitude to occur in the U.S. during the social networking era", and present-day manifestations, most of which he has said have yet to be studied in-depth by sociologists. 

In 2016, Bartholomew investigated the 2012 case of an outbreak of hiccups in Danvers, Massachusetts (originally Old Salem village), in which 24 young people were stricken with apparently uncontrollable hiccups. After requesting and reviewing state documents from the original investigation, he concluded the most likely explanation was a psychogenic conversion disorder affecting the (predominantly) girls involved. He publicly stated the Massachusetts Department of Public Health had "knowingly issued an inaccurate, incomplete report...They have an obligation to issue accurate diagnoses, and patients have a right to know what made them sick" and filed official complaints of malpractice.

Bartholomew has also drawn attention to the role of the internet in acting as an "echo chamber" for spreading moral outrage; for example on social media, pedophile allegations used as political weapons by supporters of the far right against liberal celebrities, which mirrors earlier public outrage which took the form of the Red Scare (particularly McCarthyism) and the Lavender scare against homosexuals in US government positions.

Bartholomew is frequently interviewed as an expert on topics as diverse as the "Pokémon Panic" of 1997, the spread of UFO conspiracy theories, the 2016 clown panic (which he suggested was a moral panic fueled by social media in response to a fear of strangers and terrorism), the viral spread of online fads such as Pokémon Go, and Havana Syndrome, the suspected energy weapon attacks against American and Canadian government personnel which began in 2016,  about which he said:

In 2020, Bartholomew co-authored Havana Syndrome: Mass Psychogenic Illness and the Real Story Behind the Embassy Mystery and Hysteria, a book on the sonic attack controversy in Cuba, with Professor Robert W. Baloh, a neurologist at the UCLA Medical Center. The book document dozens of similar examples of disorders that have essentially the same features as "Havana Syndrome", but were given different labels, from the 18th century belief that sounds from certain musical instruments were harmful to human health, to contemporary panics involving people living near wind turbines.

In March 2020, Bartholomew was invited to attend a medical conference in Havana, Cuba, on the "attacks", where he repeated the claim that stress-induced mass psychogenic illness was the most likely cause.

Publications

Academic papers
Bartholomew has written over 60 academic papers including:
 Protean nature of mass sociogenic illness (2002) with Simon Wessely, British Journal of Psychiatry
 A social-psychological theory of collective anxiety attacks: the "Mad Gasser" reexamined (2004) with Jeffrey S. Victor, Sociological Quarterly
 Epidemic Hysteria in Schools: an international and historical overview (2006) with Francois Sirois, Educational Studies
 How Should Mental Health Professionals Respond to Outbreaks of Mass Psychogenic Illness? (2011) with M. Chandra Sekaran Muniratnam, Journal of Cognitive Psychotherapy
 Mass psychogenic illness and the social network: is it changing the pattern of outbreaks? (2012) with G. James Rubin and Simon Wessely, Journal of the Royal Society of Medicine
 Science for sale: the rise of predatory journals (2014), Journal of the Royal Society of Medicine
In addition Bartholomew contributes to several newspapers and journals on various sociological and fringe science topics, including Psychology Today, Skeptical Inquirer, and British magazines The Skeptic and Fortean Times.

Books
Bartholomew is the author of several popular science and skeptical non-fiction books including:
 UFOs & Alien Contact: Two Centuries of Mystery (1998) with George S. Howard
 Exotic Deviance: Medicalizing Cultural Idioms (2000)
 Little Green Men, Meowing Nuns and Head-Hunting Panics: A Study of Mass Psychogenic Illness and Social Delusion (2001)
 Hoaxes, Myths, and Manias: Why We Need Critical Thinking (2003) with Benjamin Radford
 Panic Attacks (2004) with Hilary Evans
 Bigfoot Encounters in New York & New England: Documented Evidence Stranger Than Fiction  (2008) with Paul B. Bartholomew
 Outbreak! The Encyclopedia of Extraordinary Social Behavior (2009) with Hilary Evans
 The Martians Have Landed!: A History of Media-Driven Panics and Hoaxes (2012) with Benjamin Radford
 Australia's Forgotten Children: The Corrupt State of Education in the Northern Territory (2012)
 The Untold Story of Champ: A Social History of America's Loch Ness Monster (2012)
 Mass Hysteria in Schools: A Worldwide History Since 1566 (2014) with Bob Rickard
 A Colorful History of Popular Delusions (2015) with Peter Hassall
 American Hauntings: The True Stories behind Hollywood's Scariest Movies―from The Exorcist to The Conjuring (2015) with Joe Nickell
 American Intolerance: Our Dark History of Demonizing Immigrants (2019) with Anja E. Reumschüssel
 Havana Syndrome: Mass Psychogenic Illness and the Real Story Behind the Embassy Mystery and Hysteria (2020) with Robert W. Baloh
 No Māori Allowed: New Zealand's forgotten history of racial segregation (2020).

Reception
William Gibson in Mother Jones described Outbreak! The Encyclopedia of Extraordinary Social Behavior as "Essential reading for the era of Trump" while Véronique Campion-Vincent described it as "exceptional in its scope...an indispensable working tool for researchers". Michael Bywater in The Daily Telegraph described Panic Attacks as "a revealing historical corrective to the tempting view that media manipulation is a late-20th-century invention."

On 19 June 2020, Bartholomew told Te Ao Maori News that a publisher had said his book No Māori Allowed: New Zealand’s Forgotten History of Racial Segregation was too pro-Maori.  Bartholomew maintained that the stories of segregation needed to be told and New Zealand must '"acknowledge its racist past."

An October 2021 article published by the Office for Science and Society of McGill University, which was critical of the official claims about Havana Syndrome, referred readers to Havana Syndrome: Mass Psychogenic Illness and the Real Story Behind the Embassy Mystery and Hysteria as a "fantastic book" saying it contextualize the syndrome in a history of acoustical scares, PTSD, and unwarranted accusations of state terrorism."

Recognition
In 2017, Bartholomew was elected a Fellow of the Committee for Skeptical Inquiry.

See also
 Dancing mania
 Hysterical contagion
 Seattle windshield pitting epidemic

References

Living people
1958 births
American sociologists
American male non-fiction writers
American male journalists
James Cook University alumni
Flinders University alumni
Medical sociologists
American skeptics
American expatriates in New Zealand